Durrow is a civil parish in County Offaly, Ireland.

Durrow is one of 4 civil parishes in the barony of Ballycowan in the Province of Leinster. It is contiguous with the remainder of the Durrow civil parish, which is in County Westmeath.

Durrow civil parish, County Offaly comprises the small village of Durrow and 21 townlands: Acantha, Aghancarnan, Ashfield, Balleek, Balleek Beg, Ballybought, Ballycallaghan, Ballynamona, Cartron, Coleraine, Coniker, Coolnahely, Culleen, Doory, Durrow Demesne, Gormagh, Kilclare, Kildangan, Loughaun, Lug and Tara.

The neighbouring civil parishes are: Ardnurcher or Horseleap (County Westmeath) to the north, Ballycommon to the east, Kilbride to the south, Rahan to the west and Kilbride to the west and north.

References

Civil parishes of County Offaly